Allsup may refer to:

Businesses
Allsup's, an American convenience store chain

People with the surname
James Allsup, American anti-semitic white supremacist
Lynne Allsup, American former swimmer
Michael Allsup, American guitarist
Tommy Allsup, American rockabilly musician

Places
Mount Allsup, a mountain in Antarctica